The ICC Academy (ICCA) is a cricket academy located in  Dubai Sports City, Dubai, United Arab Emirates, that is managed and administered by the International Cricket Council. It was opened in 2009 under Rod Marsh, who was appointed as Director.

History 

ICCA's facilities includes two ovals, each with ten turf pitches, outdoor turf and synthetic practice facilities, indoor practice facilities including Hawk Eye technology and a cricket-specific gymnasium. The opening was delayed until 2009. This Academy is planned and Managed by the International Cricket Council (ICC). The two cricket grounds are installed with floodlights.

ICCA was finally opened by Sharad Pawar, President ICC, Alan Isaac, VP, ICC and members of Dubai Sports City in October 2010. ICCA was used for the 2014 ICC Under-19 Cricket World Cup.

Facilities 

 2 full-size floodlit cricket ovals
 38 Natural Turf pitches
 6 indoor practice pitches
 5700 square foot outdoor conditioning area
 Multi-media team room
 Physiotherapy and Medicine Centre
 6 lane cricket cage

Uses 
The academy regularly hosts international events such as:
 U-19 Cricket World Cup: 2014
 World T20 Qualifier: 2012
 Intercontinental Cup: 2011, 2012
 World Cricket League 
It is also used as a training ground by:
 United Arab Emirates 
 Pakistan
 South Africa 
 Australia
 Sri Lanka

List of Centuries

One Day Internationals
The following list summarizes the centuries scored in one Day Internationals at the venue.

List of Five Wicket Hauls

One Day Internationals

T20Is

See also

International Cricket Council
Dubai Sports City

References

External links
Official website of ICC Academy
Official Website of Dubai Sports City
  Official Website of International Cricket Council

Global
Cricket academies
Cricket in the United Arab Emirates
2009 establishments in the United Arab Emirates
Dubai Sports City
National Cricket Academy